HMS Alnwick Castle was one of 44 s built for the Royal Navy during the Second World War. She was named after Alnwick Castle in Northumberland. Completed in late 1944, the ship served as a convoy escort until the end of the war, helping to sink one German submarine. The corvette was placed in reserve after the war and was sold for scrap in 1958.

Design and description
The Castle-class corvette was a stretched version of the preceding Flower class, enlarged to improve seakeeping and to accommodate modern weapons. They were powered by a pair of triple-expansion steam engines, each driving one propeller shaft using steam provided by two Admiralty three-drum boilers. The ships' complement was 99 officers and ratings.

The Castle-class ships were equipped with a single QF  Mk XVI gun forward, but their primary weapon was their single three-barrel Squid anti-submarine mortar. This was backed up by one depth charge rail and two throwers for 15 depth charges. The ships were fitted with two twin and a pair of single mounts for  Oerlikon light AA guns. Provision was made for a further four single mounts if needed. They were equipped with Type 145Q and Type 147B ASDIC sets to detect submarines by reflections from sound waves beamed into the water. A Type 277 search radar and a HF/DF radio direction finder rounded out the Castles' sensor suite.

Construction and career
Alnwick Castle was laid down by George Brown & Co. at their shipyard at Greenock on 12 June 1943 and launched on 23 May 1944. She was completed on 11 November and served as a convoy escort until the end of the Second World War in May 1945. 

On 17 February 1945, Alnwick Castle, Lt. Cdr. H.A. Stonehouse R.N.R., and  used depth charges to sink German submarine U-425 near Murmansk.

Alnwick Cstle was placed in reserve on 25 May and was sold for scrap in 1958. She arrived at Gateshead in December to be broken up.

Citations

Bibliography
 
 
 
 
 

 

Castle-class corvettes
1944 ships